Robert Fredrick ("Ric") Stowe (born 1944) is a businessman who was once prominent in Western Australia.

Stowe acquired Griffin Coal in 1979 and later acquired SkyWest and East-West Airlines during the 1980s. In 1984, Stowe joined the John Curtin Foundation along with Alan Bond, Ernest Henry Lee-Steere and Laurie Connell to raise funds for the then premier of Western Australia, Brian Burke.

The reclusive millionaire moved to Monaco in 1986, mooring his  yacht Capella at the tax haven. Since then he has split his time between his new home and Western Australia.

Stowe separated from his partner, Jemma Lee-Steere (Ernest Lee-Steere's daughter), in 1990. The subsequent court battle was subjected to media scrutiny. The couple had three daughters and a son and had been together for ten years. Though they never married, she changed her surname to Stowe by deed poll at his insistence. In 1994 she sued Stowe for 250 million and, by 2000, a settlement was reached. In 2003, Stowe married Anne-Margaret MacDermott of Perth, his fourth wife.

In 2010 administrators were called in when Griffin Coal failed to pay a 25-million instalment on 475 million worth of bonds. Griffin had also failed to pay the Australian Taxation Office a 5-million instalment of a 65-million debt. The company collapsed shortly afterwards, leaving an estimated 2 billion debt on coal and associated energy assets. Soon after, properties from another Stowe company, WR Carpenter Agriculture Pty Ltd, which controlled a herd of 50,000 cattle, were being sold off; these included Minilya and Joanna Plains Stations.

A fire sale of Stowe assets followed, with his estate, Devereaux Farm, near Bullsbrook selling in 2013. The  propertywith a 20-room, 8-bathroom mansion, two swimming pools, two helipads and a polo fieldfor which the asking price was 70 million, sold for 21.35 million in 2013.

References

Living people
1944 births
Australian businesspeople
Australian expatriates in Monaco